The 2003–04 George Mason Patriots men's basketball team began their 38th season of collegiate play on November 21, 2003 versus Morehead State University at the Patriot Center in Fairfax, VA.

Season notes

 On March 31, 2004, head coach Jim Larranaga received a two-year contract extension to push his deal through 2009.
 Freshman guard Lamar Butler missed three games with a left foot injury.
 On October 29, 2004, the 2003-04 George Mason Patriots were predicted to finish 1st in the Colonial Athletic Association.

Awards

First Team All-CAA
 Jai Lewis

Second Team All-CAA
 Mark Davis

CAA Player of the Week
 Jai Lewis - Jan. 5
 Jai Lewis - Jan. 26
 Jai Lewis - Feb. 16

Roster

Player stats

Game log

Recruits

The following is a list of commitments George Mason has received for the 2004-2005 season:
 Folarin Campbell
 Jordan Carter
 Will Thomas
 John Vaughan

References

George Mason
George Mason Patriots men's basketball seasons
George Mason
2003 in sports in Virginia
2004 in sports in Virginia